VC Recordings trading as Hut Records was a British record label brand which was started in 1990 as a wholly owned subsidiary of Virgin Records. Despite being wholly owned by a major label, it was classed as an independent label for the purposes  of the UK Indie Chart due to the independent distribution, which was used by Virgin as a means of gaining exposure for new acts.

The label was managed by former Virgin retail assistant and Rough Trade label manager Dave Boyd, and it was originally set up as means of obtaining independent distribution for Moose and Revolver. Boyd persuaded the Virgin management to give the label complete creative control.  Hut expanded by licensing Smashing Pumpkins from Caroline Records, with Boyd convincing Caroline that Hut could do a better job of promoting their Gish album than Caroline's UK arm. The next band to be signed were Verve, whose "She's a Superstar" reached number one on the indie chart. Boyd's approach was to sign "quality bands and artists with attitude" like These Animal Men, Smash and The Auteurs.

Hut Records was discontinued by Virgin Records in mid-2004 due to an overhaul of the group, 20% of the artists on Hut were dropped whilst the rest were moved to other labels within the EMI Group.

Groups or musicians associated with Hut
This is a list of musicians who have at one time been signed to Hut.

 Acetone
 The Burn
 Crackout
 The Crescent
 Daryll-Ann
 David Gray
 David McAlmont
 McAlmont & Butler (with Bernard Butler to Chrysalis)
 Thieves
 Drop Nineteens
 Embrace (from Hut to Independiente Records)
 Gomez (from Hut to Independiente)
 Heron
 Hobotalk
 James Iha
 Jepp
 Jon Spencer Blues Explosion
 Luke Haines
 The Auteurs
 Baader Meinhof
 Marianne Faithfull
 Moose
 The Music
 Neneh Cherry (from Virgin to Hut)
 One Inch Punch
 The Origin
 Placebo (from Hut to Virgin)
 Revolver
 Richard Ashcroft (from Hut to Parlophone and then Righteous Phonographic Association Label)
 Royal Trux
 The Smashing Pumpkins
 Stephanie Kirkham
 These Animal Men
 Toiling Midgets
 Urban Dance Squad
 The Verve (from Hut to Parlophone)
 Whale
 μ-ziq

References

1990 establishments in the United Kingdom
2004 disestablishments in the United Kingdom
Alternative rock record labels
British record labels
Indie rock record labels
Record labels disestablished in 2004
Record labels established in 1990
Virgin Records